Bunches Florapost Ltd. is a flowers by post company based in Newstead, Nottinghamshire.

Company history
Bunches is a family business founded by Erik and Sandra Hoving in 1989. Bunches was a small flower stall which they had set up under a 3 metre by 4 metre umbrella in the Four Seasons shopping centre in Mansfield, Nottinghamshire. Bunches began as a flowers by post company in January 1990, operating out of a factory in Kirkby-in-Ashfield. Orders were taken over the Post Office counter and then telephoned through to the Bunches office, which at the time was staffed by just 3 people.

In 1992, Bunches expanded to all Post Offices nationwide and the direct mail side of the business began, which was great success. During this time, Bunches also began offering chocolates with the flowers, a first in the UK flower trade. In 2001, after out-growing the original factory, Bunches moved into a purpose built premises with state-of-the-art Sales Office, Production and Despatch facilities, based in Newstead Village, Nottinghamshire. A £1 million extension, doubling the size of the production floor space and adding new offices was completed in November 2007.

Bunches trades online, through affiliates, direct mail sales, business to business as well as its own online store and through online services with the bulk of trade coming from the Bunches.co.uk website.

Bunches imports flowers from around the world and deliveries are made by Royal Mail 1st Class Post and Special Delivery services along with next day courier services through DPD.

Bunches is a member of The Flowers & Plants Association and are listed as supplying ethically grown flowers & plants.

Since Bunches was founded in 1989 they have delivered over 8 million bouquets throughout the UK, and has received press attention due to continued growth at the company during the recent recession.

In 2010, Bunches won the Nottingham Post Nottinghamshire Company of The Year award.

In 2017, Bunches launched a major revamp of their brand and website.

In 2019, Bunches launched the first entirely plastic-free range (Letterbox Flowers).

References

External links
 www.bunches.co.uk - Flowers By Post

Online retailers of the United Kingdom
Companies based in Nottinghamshire
Florist companies